Gilbert Onyekachukwu Ibezim (born 19 November 1978 in Mbaukwu, Awka South, Nigeria) is a Nigerian politician and medical doctor who is the current Deputy Governor of Anambra State since 17 March 2022. Ibezim won the 2021 Anambra State gubernatorial elections alongside his running mate Charles Soludo on the platform of the All Progressives Grand Alliance (APGA). Ibezim is also a brother to the Anglican bishop of the Diocese on the Niger, Alexander Ibezim.

References 

Living people
People from Anambra State
Anambra State politicians
All Progressives Grand Alliance politicians
Year of birth missing (living people)